Paul J. Wasicka (born February 17, 1981 in Dallas, Texas) is a professional poker player, based in Denver, Colorado who was the runner-up at the 2006 World Series of Poker Main Event and the winner of the 2007 NBC National Heads-Up Poker Championship. Paul attended college in Madison, WI.

World Series of Poker
Wasicka finished as runner-up to Jamie Gold in the 2006 World Series of Poker Main Event, winning over $6,000,000.

Other poker events

NBC National Heads-Up Poker Championship 
Wasicka's tournament accomplishments since that World Series of Poker finish include winning the 2007 NBC National Heads-Up Poker Championship by defeating Eli Elezra, Joe Hachem, T. J. Cloutier, Nam Le, Shannon Elizabeth, and finally Chad Brown in the finals 2-0. He won $500,000 for his victory in the tournament.

World Poker Tour 
At the World Poker Tour (WPT) $9,900 No Limit Hold'em held at the 2007 L.A. Poker Classic, Wasicka made the final table which also included poker players J. C. Tran and Eric Hershler, he finished in fourth place, earning $455,615. Wasicka has also cashed in three other WPT Championship events and has made a total of over $700,000 from WPT events alone.

Aussie Millions
At the 2007 Aussie Millions A$10,000 Main Event, Wasicka just missed making the final table, coming in 12th and earning A$120,000 ($95,434). The event was won by fellow professional poker player Gus Hansen.

As of 2016, Wasicka's total live tournament winnings exceed $7,885,000. His 14 cashes at the WSOP account for $6,308,316 of those winnings.

Notes

External links
Official website
PokerLizard.com Interview

1981 births
American poker players
National Heads-Up Poker Championship winners
World Series of Poker Circuit event winners
Living people